The Council of Ministers (German: Ministerrat der Deutschen Demokratischen Republik) was the cabinet and executive branch of the German Democratic Republic from November 1950 until the country was reunified on 3 October 1990. Originally formed as a body of 18 members, by 1989 the council consisted of 44 members.

Under the Constitution of East Germany, the Council of Ministers was formally defined as the government of East Germany. The same Constitution, however, officially confirmed the leading role of the Socialist Unity Party (SED). Hence, for most of the GDR's existence, the Council of Ministers was not the highest authority in the country, but was charged with implementing the SED's policies into practical administration. In particular, ministers were subordinate to the secretary of the Central Committee responsible for their portfolio, and, at least unofficially, to the General Secretary.

Structure

The Council was led by a chairman (Vorsitzender), who was usually called "prime minister" in non-German sources.  There were two first deputy chairmen and nine other deputy chairmen.  Together with some key ministers they formed the presidency (Präsidium) of the Council.  The Präsidium prepared all decisions in consultation with the responsible departments of the Central Committee (Zentralkomitee) of the Socialist Unity Party of Germany (SED) and especially the Politbüro of the SED Central Committee.  The Präsidium managed the day-to-day affairs of the Council between its weekly meetings, which took place regularly on Wednesdays to execute the resolutions of the Politbüro’s weekly meetings (on Tuesdays).  The secretaries and department managers in the Central Committee were authorized to give instructions to the ministers as necessary.

Officially, the prime minister held the highest state post in the GDR. Despite this, no SED first secretary/general secretary ever simultaneously served as prime minister.

Until the Wende in the fall of 1989, the two first deputy chairmen were Werner Krolikowski and Alfred Neumann, who were both members of the SED Politbüro.  Other deputy chairmen included the leaders of the four allied parties (Blockparteien).  Additional members included the chairman of the State Planning Commission, the president of the Staatsbank der DDR (State Bank of the GDR) and some state secretaries, who were usually office directors at the Council.  All members of the Council were selected by the GDR Volkskammer (parliament) for a term of five years.  Within the centralized state structure of the GDR, the city, county and district administrations were subordinated to the Council.

Willi Stoph and his entire cabinet resigned on 7 November 1989. Stoph was succeeded by Hans Modrow. The SED gave up its monopoly of power on 1 December. Modrow continued in office, leading a cabinet with both SED and non-communist members. For much of the winter of 1989 and 1990, he was the de facto leader of East Germany. Modrow was succeeded by Lothar de Maizière after what turned out to be the only free election ever held in East Germany, in March 1990. The de Maizière cabinet presided over the transition period to the reunification of the two Germanies in October 1990.

The former Prussian state parliament (Preußischer Landtag) served as the seat of the Council from 1950 to 1953. From 1961 to 1990 the Council's offices were located in the former Old City Hall of Berlin at No. 47 Klosterstraße.  The Law Gazette of the GDR (Gesetzblatt der DDR) was also published by the Council.  In addition, the Council’s Press Office made official government announcements and was responsible for the accreditation of foreign journalists in the GDR.

The individual ministries had their own headquarters buildings in East Berlin, although the former Reich Air Ministry building on Leipziger Straße housed the industrially-oriented ministries.

Chairmen of the Council of Ministers

|-
! colspan="7"| Minister-President of the German Democratic Republic
|-

|-
! colspan="7"| Chairman of the Council of Ministers of the German Democratic Republic
|-

|-
! colspan="7"| Minister-President of the German Democratic Republic
|-

Ministries
Ministry of National Defense*: Willi Stoph, Heinz Hoffmann, Heinz Kessler, Theodor Hoffmann, Rainer Eppelmann (1990)
Ministry of Foreign Affairs: Georg Dertinger (1949–1953), Lothar Bolz (1953–1965), Otto Winzer (1965–1975), Oskar Fischer (1975–1990), Markus Meckel (1990), Lothar de Maizière, (1990)
Ministry of State Security (Stasi)**: Wilhelm Zaisser, Ernst Wollweber, Erich Mielke, Wolfgang Schwanitz
Ministry of the Interior: Karl Steinhoff, Karl Maron, Friedrich Dickel; Lothar Ahrendt, Peter-Michael Diestel (1990)
 Ministry of Finance: Hans Loch, Willy Rumpf, Siegfried Böhm (1966–80), Werner Schmieder, Ernst Höfner (1981–90), Uta Nickel (1989/90), Walter Romberg, Werner Skowron (1990)
Ministry of Transport: Hans Reingruber, Erwin Kramer, Otto Arndt, Heinrich Scholz, Herbert Keddi, Horst Gibtner (1990)
Ministry for Posts and Telecommunications: Friedrich Burmeister, Rudolph Schulze (CDU), Klaus Wolf (CDU), Emil Schnell (1990)
Ministry of Culture: Johannes R. Becher, Alexander Abusch, Hans Bentzien, Klaus Gysi, Hans Joachim Hoffmann, Dietmar Keller, Herbert Schirmer (1990)
Ministry of National Education***: Elisabeth Zaisser, Fritz Lange, Alfred Lemmnitz, Margot Honecker (1963–1989, Helga Labs, Hans Heinz Emons)
Ministry of Higher and Technical Education: Ernst Joachim Gießmann, Hans Joachim Böhme
Ministry of Science and Technology: Herbert Weiz (1974–89), at the same time 1967-89 one of the Deputy Chairmen of the MR; Peter Klaus Budig (LDPD)
Ministry of Health: Luitpold Steidle (1949–58), Max Sefrin (1958–71), Ludwig Mecklinger, Klaus Thielmann, Jürgen Kleditzsch (1990)
Ministry of Environmental Protection and Water Management: Werner Titel (1971), Hans Reichelt (DBD), Karl H. Steinberg (1990)
Ministry of Justice: Max Fechner, Hilde Benjamin, Kurt Wünsche (also 1990), Hans Joachim Heusinger (of both latter members of the LDPD)
Minister and Chairman of the Workers' and Farmers' Inspection (Arbeiter- und Bauerninspektion): Heinz Matthes
Chairman of the State Planning Commission: Heinrich Rau, Bruno Leuschner, Karl Mewis, Erich Apel, Gerhard Schürer
Director of the Press Office: Kurt Blecha, Wolfgang Meyer

Ministries  of the industries  (1961-1965 in the course New Economic System were summarized the Ministries in national economy advice under his chairman Alfred Neumann): 
Ministry of Ore mining industry, metallurgy and potash: Kurt Fichtner, Kurt Singhuber (1967–89)
Ministry of Electro-technology and electronics: Otfried Steger, Felix Meier
Ministry of Coal and energy: Wolfgang Mitzinger
Ministry of Chemical industry: Siegbert Löschau, Günther Wyschofsky *Structure building industry: Lothar Bolz (1949–53), Heinz Winkler (1953–58), Ernst Scholz, Wolfgang Junker (1963–89); Gerhard Baumgärtel, Axel Viehweger (1990)
Ministry of Basic industry
Ministry of Glass and ceramic(s) industry: Werner Greiner Petter, Karl Grünheid (1983–89)
Ministry of Stock management: Alfred Neumann (1965–68), Manfred Flegel, Wolfgang Rauchfuß
Ministry of Tool and building of processing machines: Rudi Georgi (1973–89)
Ministry of General construction of vehicles, machine and agricultural machinery (since 1990: Mechanical engineering): Günther Kleiber, Gerhard Tautenhahn, Karl Grünheid
Ministry of Heavy machine and equipment construction (since 1990: Heavy industry): Fritz Selbmann, Rolf Kersten, Hans Joachim Lauck, Kurt Singhuber
Ministry of Land, forest and food processing industry: Ernst Goldenbaum, Paul Scholz, Georg Ewald, Heinz Kuhrig, Bruno Lietz; Hans Watzek, Peter Pollack (1990)
Ministry of Light Industry: Karl Bettin, Werner Buschmann, Gunter Halm (NDPD)
Ministry of District-led and foodstuffs industry: Erhard Krack, Udo Dieter Wange
Ministry of Trade and supply: Curt Heinz Merkel, Karl Hamann, Gerhard Lucht, Günter Sieber (1965–72), Manfred Flegel * Foreign trade: Georg Ulrich Handke, Heinrich Rau (1955–61), Julius Balkow, Horst Sölle, Gerhard Beil 1989 and/or 1990 again imported:
Ministry of Economics (new since 1989): Christa Luft (1989/90), Gerhard Pohl (1990)
Ministry of Tourism (new since 1989): Bruno Benthien (LDPD)
Ministry of Work and Wages (new since 1989)/work and social (since 1990): Hannelore Mensch, Jürgen Kleditzsch * Family and women (new 1990): Christa Schmidt (CDU)

* Renamed in 1990 as the Ministry for Disarmament and Defense.

** Renamed on 17 November 1989 as the Office for National Security (Amt für Nationale Sicherheit - AfNS); abolished on 13 January 1990.

*** Renamed in 1989 as the Ministry for Education and Youth.

See also
State Council of the German Democratic Republic

References

 
 
1950 establishments in East Germany
1990 disestablishments in East Germany